The Coppersmith method, proposed by Don Coppersmith, is a method to find small integer zeroes of univariate or bivariate polynomials modulo a given integer. The method uses the Lenstra–Lenstra–Lovász lattice basis reduction algorithm (LLL) to find a polynomial that has the same zeroes as the target polynomial but smaller coefficients.

In cryptography, the Coppersmith method is mainly used in attacks on RSA when parts of the secret key are known and forms a base for Coppersmith's attack.

Approach 
Coppersmith's approach is a reduction of solving modular polynomial equations to solving polynomials over the integers.

Let  and assume that  for some
integer .
Coppersmith’s algorithm can be used to find this integer solution .

The idea behind Coppersmith’s method is to find a different polynomial  related to  that has the same root  modulo , but has only small coefficients.

Coppersmith's algorithm uses the Lenstra–Lenstra–Lovász lattice basis reduction algorithm (LLL) to construct the polynomial  with small coefficients.
Any linear combination of these polynomials also has  as a root modulo .

The next step is to use the LLL algorithm to construct a linear combination 
of the  so that the inequality  holds.

Implementations 
Coppersmith's method for univariate polynomials is implemented in
 Magma as the function SmallRoots;
 PARI/GP as the function zncoppersmith;
 SageMath as the method small_roots.

References
 
 
 
 
 

Asymmetric-key algorithms
1996 introductions